Lev Mordukhovich Tseitlin ("Leyb Tseytlin", born 1884, in Pinsk – July 8, 1930, in New York City), known as Leo Zeitlin, was a Russian-Jewish composer. In 1923, he emigrated to the United States. His best-known work is Eli Zion, a paraphrase for piano and cello "on a folk theme and trope of 'Song of Songs'".

Life
Zeitlin was a violinist, violist, conductor and impresario who was active in Saint Petersburg's Society for Jewish Folk Music. In 1923, shortly after he arrived in New York City with his wife Esther from the Free City of Danzig, he became the violist and arranger for the Capitol Theatre.

In 1925, he began arranging orchestral and small ensemble pieces for the Capitol's radio program on WEAF, which in 1926 became the flagship station of the NBC Red Network. Beginning in 1926, the series of light classical concerts titled Capitol Theatre was broadcast by the NBC Red Network on Sunday evenings from 7:20pm to 9:15pm. This series continued until 1929, not long before Zeitlin's death.

In an article written by Pro Musica Hebraica, Zeitlin is described as "one of the most important Russian Jewish composers to resurface, after decades of neglect, as a leading figure in the history of twentieth-century Jewish art music." According to this source, all of Zeitlin's known chamber works were included in a print volume in 2008.

Works (selection) 
 Eli Zion (Paraphrase on a folk theme and trop of "Song of Songs"), for cello & piano
 Palestina (Rhapsody on Hebrew Themes)
 Five Songs from the Yiddish
 , for mezzo-soprano & string quartet 
 , dramatic recitation for voice & piano 
 Berceuse, transcription for mezzo-soprano & string quartet 
 , for mezzo-soprano, string quartet & piano 
 , for mezzo-soprano, violin, viola & piano (after Shkliar) 
 , for mezzo-soprano & string quartet 
 , for mezzo-soprano, violin, viola, cello & piano 
 , for mezzo-soprano, baritone & string quartet 
 , arrangement for mezzo-soprano, violin, viola & piano (after Shalyt) 
 More, dramatic recitation for voice & piano 
 , for mezzo-soprano, string quartet & piano (after Saminsky) 
 , for string quintet 
 , for mezzo-soprano, string quartet & piano (after Shalyt) 
 , dramatic recitation for voice & piano 
 Wiener Volkslied (Du alter Stefansturm), for string quartet (after F. Kreisler) 
 , dramatic recitation for voice & piano 
 , for mezzo-soprano, baritone & piano

Bibliography 
Paula Eisenstein Baker (ed.): Leo Zeitlin, Chamber Music (A-R Editions, Inc., 2008) 
Paula Eisenstein Baker (ed.): Leo Zeitlin, Palestina (A-R Editions, Inc., 2014)

References

External links
The New York Times obituary (July 9, 1930)
Paula Eisenstein Baker, "The Mystery of Leo Zeitlin", Associated Musicians of New York Newsletter (January 2014)

1884 births
1930 deaths
Composers from the Russian Empire
Emigrants from the Russian Empire to the United States
American people of Russian-Jewish descent
Jewish composers
Jewish classical composers
Russian Jews
Russian male classical composers
20th-century Russian male musicians